Puff adder is the common name of several snake species:

 Bitis arietans, a venomous snake species found in Africa and the southern Arabian Peninsula
 Bitis, any other member of this genus
 Heterodon, a genus of harmless North American colubrid snakes commonly known as hognose snakes

Puff adder may also refer to:

 Puff Adder (comics), a mutant supervillain in the Marvel Universe

See also 

 Pofadder (disambiguation)

Animal common name disambiguation pages